Carlos Palau (born March 4, 1959) is a Spanish former racing driver.

He started racing in motorbikes switching to cars in 1986 racing at Spanish Renault Turbo Cup.
He had a long term relation with Ford working in the development of the Mondeo 4x4 FIA II supertourer.
He joined Ford UK team in 1994 FIA Supertouring World Championship at Donington.
He raced 3 times in 24 Hours of Le Mans winning GT Class in 1994 with Porsche.
In GT Class he raced with big brands as Ferrari, Porsche, Lamborghini, Lister and Saleen.
With Saleen he won the Spanish GT2 Championship in 1999 and Spanish GT Championship in 2001.

Racing highlights
 24 Hour of Le Mans in 1994, 1995, 1997
 1992 Spanish Touring Car Vice Champion
 1993 Spanish Touring Car Championship − Third
 1994 24 Hours of Le Mans GT2 Winner
 1999 Spanish GT Championship GT2 Winner
 2000 Spanish GT Championship Vice Champion
 2001 Spanish GT Championship Winner, 24 Hours of Barcelona Winner

See also
1994 24 Hours of Le Mans
Spanish GT Championship

References

1959 births
Living people
Spanish racing drivers
World Sportscar Championship drivers
24 Hours of Le Mans drivers
Larbre Compétition drivers